"Liquid Dreams" is a song recorded by American boy band O-Town. It was released on October 31, 2000, as the lead single from their debut album, O-Town. The song reached number one in Canada, number 10 in the United States, and number three in the United Kingdom. The song is about wet dreams filled with sexual innuendos and pop culture references, including references to Destiny's Child, Madonna, and Janet Jackson.

Background

O-Town was assembled for the first season of the ABC reality television series Making the Band. Originally Ikaika Kahoano was one of the five members selected but he and his family decided he should go to med school instead causing him to back out, making way for Dan Miller who was selected by the four remaining members.

The ratings of Making the Band were strong enough to warrant a second (and eventually third) season. These subsequent seasons depicted their development as a pop group, following their tours and performances. Such events included the development of their second album, O2, their transition to a new record label (J Records), and an ongoing effort to establish themselves. The third season of Making the Band was broadcast on MTV, instead of the original network, ABC. After season one, Clive Davis of J Records signed O-Town to his new label as he believed in the marketability of the group, and scheduled O-Town to be the label's debut act.

The song references a dozen famous female actresses and musicians including Destiny's Child, Madonna, Janet Jackson, Cindy Crawford, Tyra Banks, Angelina Jolie, Salma Hayek, and Halle Berry. The name Jennifer is mentioned but no last name is given leading to speculation it may be either Jennifer Lopez, Jennifer Aniston or Jennifer Love Hewitt.

Track listings

US CD and cassette single
 "Liquid Dreams" – 3:29
 "Liquid Dreams" (Matrix remix) – 3:26
 "All for Love" – 3:26

UK CD1
 "Liquid Dreams" – 3:30
 "Liquid Dreams" (Rizzo Mixshow) – 6:24
 "Take Me Under" – 4:08

UK CD2
 "Liquid Dreams" – 3:30
 "Liquid Dreams" (HQ2 Mixshow) – 5:48
 "Liquid Dreams" (HQ2 instrumental) – 5:48
 "Liquid Dreams" (video)

UK cassette single
 "Liquid Dreams" – 3:29
 "Take Me Under" – 4:08

European CD single
 "Liquid Dreams" – 3:29
 "All for Love" – 3:26

Australian CD single
 "Liquid Dreams" – 3:29
 "All for Love" – 3:26
 "Liquid Dreams" (Matrix mix) – 3:26
 "Liquid Dreams" (Hot Hex Hector remix) – 3:11

Credits and personnel
Credits are taken from the US CD single liner notes.

Studio
 Mixed at Larrabee North (Los Angeles)

Personnel

 Bradley Spalter – writing, production, programming
 Joshua P. Thompson – writing (as Joshua Thompson), vocal arrangement and production
 Michael Norfleet – writing, programming
 Quincy Patrick – writing, vocal arrangement and production
 David Pic Conley – associate vocal producer
 Adam Kagan – engineering, programming
 Adam Barber – engineering

 Pete Karam – engineering
 Clive Davis – executive producer
 Keith Naftaly – A&R
 Hosh Gureli – A&R
 Mike Cronin – management
 Mike Morin – management

Charts

Weekly charts

Year-end charts

Certifications

Release history

References

2000 debut singles
2000 songs
2001 singles
O-Town songs
Bertelsmann Music Group singles
Canadian Singles Chart number-one singles
J Records singles